was a battle during the Sengoku period (16th century) of Japan. 
As part of the very long rivalry between Oda Nobuhide and Saitō Dōsan, along with Dōsan's defense of his position in Mino Province. 

Nobuhide and Dōsan fought each other on the battlefield in Kanōguchi. Nobuhide, who was the father of the famous Oda Nobunaga, ended in defeat, with the loss of two of his very close relatives. Following Nobuhide's defeat, Dōsan's name greatly spread throughout Japan.

Peace was reached between the two clans when they made a deal for Nobunaga to marry Nōhime, Dōsan's daughter.

References
Turnbull, Stephen (1998). 'The Samurai Sourcebook'. London: Cassell & Co.

1547 in Japan
Kanoguchi 1547
Conflicts in 1547